The Sankwala Mountains are a mountain range in Obanliku Local Government Area of Cross River State in Nigeria. The Sankwala Mountains lie southeast of the town of Obudu, north of the Okwangwo section of Cross River National Park.

Climate 
The Sankwala Mountains have a cool climate. This has attracted tourists to the mountains in recent years to the Obudu Plateau on the Sankwala Mountains.

Tourist activities 
The Sankwala Mountains record a high number of tourist activities every year. This has led to the development of the Obudu Mountain Resort on one of the ridges of the mountains, known as the Oshie Ridge.

References

Mountain ranges of Nigeria